Mayne is a civil parish in County Kilkenny, Ireland. It lies within the historical barony of Fassadinin.

References

Civil parishes of County Kilkenny